The Barstow Bridge was a historic Pratt pony truss bridge, at US 395 and Co. Rd. 4061, over the Kettle River near Kettle Falls, Washington.  It spanned between Ferry County, Washington and Stevens County, Washington.

It was a pre-fabricated steel bridge that was a surplus World War II bridge.  It was bought from the U.S. War Assets Administration in 1946 and was installed near the unincorporated community of Barstow in 1947.

The historic bridge was removed and replaced in 2010.

References

Road bridges in Washington (state)
National Register of Historic Places in Ferry County, Washington
National Register of Historic Places in Stevens County, Washington
Buildings and structures completed in 1947
Former road bridges in the United States
U.S. Route 395